George F. Johnson IV (born c. 1953) is a retired Maryland (USA) law enforcement officer, having served in the Anne Arundel County Police Department, as the elected sheriff of Anne Arundel County, and as the appointed superintendent of the Maryland Natural Resources Police.

Education
Johnson is a 1971 graduate of Cardinal Gibbons High School. In 1994, he graduated with an AA (Criminal Justice) from Anne Arundel Community College. Johnson is also a 1996 graduate of the National Sheriff's Institute and a 1999 graduate of the FBI National Academy.

Career
Johnson served from 1972 to 1994 in the Anne Arundel County Police Department, rising through the ranks from cadet to commander.

He served as sheriff of Anne Arundel County for three terms from 1994 until 2007, winning re-election in 1998 and 2002.

In 2006, Johnson unsuccessfully ran for County Executive of Anne Arundel County, losing to John R. Leopold (Republican). In 2010, Johnson did not contest a rematch against Leopold, even as allegations of misconduct surrounding the incumbent began to surface. In 2014, Johnson again ran for the county executive seat, running unopposed in the Democratic primary after Joanna Conti, who ran in 2006, declined to challenge him. Johnson lost to the Republican State Delegate Steve Schuh in the general election.

Johnson was appointed superintendent of the Maryland Natural Resources Police by Governor Martin O'Malley in 2007 and retired in 2015.

References

1950s births
Living people
Maryland sheriffs
People from Anne Arundel County, Maryland
Maryland Democrats